The Allison TF32 was a turbofan engine proposed by the Allison Division of General Motors in the 1960s. It was named as a finalist for the U.S. Navy's VSX aircraft for anti-submarine warfare (ASW) in January 1967, but lost the competition to the General Electric TF34 in early 1968.

Specifications (TF32-A-2)

See also

References

1960s turbofan engines
Allison aircraft engines